Brinase (or brinolase) is a fibrinolytic enzyme, and a thrombolytic drug.

It is derived from Aspergillus oryzae.

See also 
 Aspergillus oryzae

References

External links 
 

Antithrombotic enzymes